AirNav.com is a privately owned website for pilots and aviation enthusiasts. The site publishes aeronautical and airport information released by the Federal Aviation Administration (FAA) such as runway distances, airfield traffic patterns, airport frequencies (common traffic advisory frequency (CTAF), tower, ground, Automatic Terminal Information Service (ATIS)/Automated Weather Observing System (AWOS)/Automated Surface Observing System (ASOS), instrument landing system (ILS), approach and departure, center or ARTCC, clearance delivery, emergency, and Flight Service Station (FSS)/fixed-base operator (FBO) frequencies), airport operations, facilities and services, chart location, navigational coordinates and locations, radio aids, ownership information and other pertinent information that all pilots need when traveling into or out of an airport or around the United States National Airspace System (NAS). The same information is published in the Airport/Facility Directory (A/FD), updated every 56 days.

Additionally available on Airnav.com is METAR, terminal aerodrome forecast (TAF), distance calculator, times of morning and evening civil twilight and sunset/sunrise to aid the pilot for decision-making purposes and to be legally equipped for night flight, airport management remarks, Notice to Airmen (NOTAM), distances to popular landmarks and attractions, hotels, cities, and closest airports.

PDF files of Instrument Approach Procedures (IAPs), Standard Instrument Departures (SIDs) or Departure Procedures (DPs), Standard Terminal Arrival Routes (STARs) are available for print or download on each airport's directory page.

Airnav has been online since May 29, 1996.

References

Sources

 A/FD digital search on the FAA.gov website
 |FAA Airport Facility Directory as defined by the FAA

External links
www.Airnav.com/ official website
www.FAA.gov Federal Aviation Administration website

Aviation websites
Internet properties established in 1996